El Zonte is a town in La Libertad Department in El Salvador. A popular tourist destination, El Zonte has been described as a "world surfing mecca". Playa El Zonte (English: El Zonte Beach; nicknamed Bitcoin Beach) became one of the first locales in the country to accept Bitcoin as a payment method, and inspired the country's adoption of Bitcoin as a legal tender.

Town profile 
El Zonte is a town with a population of 3,000. According to Reuters, "El Zonte is visibly poor, with dirt roads and a faulty drainage system." El Zonte is located 26 miles from San Salvador, the national capital.

The local economy is heavily dependent on tourism, particularly surfing. According to France 24, El Zonte attracts tourists from United States, Canada, Europe, and Brazil looking to surf, with surfing classes costing between $10 to $50 an hour.

In El Zonte, a foreign volunteer-run program called the "Medusas" provide English and art education as well as low-cost surfing instruction. Skateboarding is a popular activity among young residents of El Zonte, and a local community skatepark was established in the town.

History 

When an anonymous American began sending Bitcoin to nonprofits there, nonprofit workers began an initiative to start a local Bitcoin ecosystem. The beach became one of the first places in El Salvador to accept Bitcoin as a method of payment: President Nayib Bukele cited the town as an inspiration for the law recognizing the cryptocurrency as one of El Salvador's two official currencies, alongside the U.S. Dollar.

In popular culture 
In 2022, the American network HBO premiered an episode of Real Sports with Bryant Gumbel that reported on the development of Bitcoin as a legal tender in El Zonte and how it has impacted the community.

References 

Beaches of El Salvador
Populated places in El Salvador